Hexokinase 2 also known as HK2 is an enzyme which in humans is encoded by the HK2 gene on chromosome 2. Hexokinases phosphorylate glucose to produce glucose-6-phosphate (G6P), the first step in most glucose metabolism pathways. This gene encodes hexokinase 2, the predominant form found in skeletal muscle. It localizes to the outer membrane of mitochondria. Expression of this gene is insulin-responsive, and studies in rat suggest that it is involved in the increased rate of glycolysis seen in rapidly growing cancer cells. [provided by RefSeq, Apr 2009]

Structure 

HK2 is one of four highly homologous hexokinase isoforms in mammalian cells.

Gene

The HK2 gene spans approximately 50 kb and consists of 18 exons. There is also an HK2 pseudogene integrated into a long interspersed nuclear repetitive DNA element located on the X chromosome. Though its DNA sequence is similar to the cDNA product of the actual HK2 mRNA transcript, it lacks an open reading frame for gene expression.

Protein
This gene encodes a 100-kDa, 917-residue enzyme with highly similar N- and C-terminal domains that each form half of the protein. This high similarity, along with the existence of a 50-kDa hexokinase (HK4), suggests that the 100-kDa hexokinases originated from a 50-kDa precursor via gene duplication and tandem ligation. Both N- and C-terminal domains possess catalytic ability and can be inhibited by G6P, though the C-terminal domain demonstrates lower affinity for ATP and is only inhibited at higher concentrations of G6P. Despite there being two binding sites for glucose, it is proposed that glucose binding at one site induces a conformational change which prevents a second glucose from binding the other site. Meanwhile, the first 12 amino acids of the highly hydrophobic N-terminal serve to bind the enzyme to the mitochondria, while the first 18 amino acids contribute to the enzyme’s stability.

Function 
As an isoform of hexokinase and a member of the sugar kinase family, HK2 catalyzes the rate-limiting and first obligatory step of glucose metabolism, which is the ATP-dependent phosphorylation of glucose to G6P. Physiological levels of G6P can regulate this process by inhibiting HK2 as negative feedback, though inorganic phosphate (Pi) can relieve G6P inhibition. Pi can also directly regulate HK2, and the double regulation may better suit its anabolic functions. By phosphorylating glucose, HK2 effectively prevents glucose from leaving the cell and, thus, commits glucose to energy metabolism. Moreover, its localization and attachment to the OMM promotes the coupling of glycolysis to mitochondrial oxidative phosphorylation, which greatly enhances ATP production to meet the cell’s energy demands. Specifically, HK2 binds VDAC to trigger opening of the channel and release mitochondrial ATP to further fuel the glycolytic process.

Another critical function for OMM-bound HK2 is mediation of cell survival. Activation of Akt kinase maintains HK2-VDAC coupling, which subsequently prevents cytochrome c release and apoptosis, though the exact mechanism remains to be confirmed. One model proposes that HK2 competes with the pro-apoptotic proteins BAX to bind VDAC, and in the absence of HK2, BAX induces cytochrome c release. In fact, there is evidence that HK2 restricts BAX and BAK oligomerization and binding to the OMM. In a similar mechanism, the pro-apoptotic creatine kinase binds and opens VDAC in the absence of HK2. An alternative model proposes the opposite, that HK2 regulates binding of the anti-apoptotic protein Bcl-Xl to VDAC.

In particular, HK2 is ubiquitously expressed in tissues, though it is majorly found in muscle and adipose tissue. In cardiac and skeletal muscle, HK2 can be found bound to both the mitochondrial and sarcoplasmic membrane. HK2 gene expression is regulated by a phosphatidylinositol 3-kinaselp70 S6 protein kinase-dependent pathway and can be induced by factors such as insulin, hypoxia, cold temperatures, and exercise. Its inducible expression indicates its adaptive role in metabolic responses to changes in the cellular environment.

Clinical significance

Cancer 

HK2 is highly expressed in several cancers, including breast cancer and colon cancer.  Its role in coupling ATP from oxidative phosphorylation to the rate-limiting step of glycolysis may help drive the tumor cells’ growth. Notably, inhibition of HK2 has demonstrably improved the effectiveness of anticancer drugs., Thus, HK2 stands as a promising therapeutic target, though considering its ubiquitous expression and crucial role in energy metabolism, a reduction rather than complete inhibition of its activity should be pursued.

Non-insulin-dependent diabetes mellitus 

A study on non-insulin-dependent diabetes mellitus (NIDDM) revealed low basal G6P levels in NIDDM patients that failed to increase with the addition of insulin. One possible cause is decreased phosphorylation of glucose due to a defect in HK2, which was confirmed in further experiments. However, the study could not establish any links between NIDDM and mutations in the HK2 gene, indicating that the defect may lie in HK2 regulation.

Interactions 

HK2 is known to interact with:
VDAC.

Interactive pathway map

See also

Hexokinase
HK1
HK3
Glucokinase

References

Further reading

External links